The 2005 PBA Fiesta Conference was the 2004–05 season's PBA Fiesta Conference of the Philippine Basketball Association. It was the second-staging of the Fiesta Conference.

The Shell Turbo Chargers won third place over Red Bull Barako in a one-game playoff. It was the last appearance of the Turbo Chargers in the league as it filed a leave of absence in August 2005, eventually selling their rights to Welcoat.

The league finally allowed Asi Taulava to play in the finals series (who was indefinitely suspended) but still lost to the veteran-laided Beermen.

Talk N' Text's Willie Miller was named the Best Player of the Conference while teammate Jerald Honeycutt won the Best Import plum.

The San Miguel Beermen won its 17th PBA title with a 4–1 series victory over Talk 'N Text Phone Pals in the finals.

List of imports

Jerald Honeycutt played for TNT in their first game and was replaced by Earl Ike (two games). He returned on April 15 vs. Purefoods, replacing Noel Felix (three games) and played for the rest of the conference.

Chris Burgess played 17 games in the Classification round and was replaced by Tommy Smith in the Beermen's last game. Burgess returned in the first two games of the semifinal series vs Red Bull before being replaced by Ace Custis.

Classification round

Team standings

Second-seed playoff

Bracket

Wildcard playoffs
The #3 vs. #10 and the #4 vs. #9 matchups are in the "twice-to-beat" format; the team with the higher seed only needs to win once to advance, but needs to be beaten twice in order to be eliminated. The other two matchups are a best-of-three series.

(3) Alaska vs. (10) Coca-Cola

(4) Sta. Lucia vs. (9) Shell

(5) FedEx vs. (8) Purefoods

(6) Red Bull vs. (7) Barangay Ginebra

Quarterfinals

(3) Alaska vs. (6) Red Bull

(8) Shell vs. (9) Purefoods

Semifinals

(1) Talk 'N Text vs. (9) Shell

(2) San Miguel vs. (6) Red Bull

Third place playoff

Finals

References

External links
 PBA.ph

Fiesta Conference
PBA Fiesta Conference